The Croatian Fraternal Union (CFU), the oldest and largest Croatian organization in North America, is a fraternal benefit society of the Croatian diaspora based out of Pittsburgh, Pennsylvania, US.

History and activities 

In the late fall of 1893 Croatian American journalist Zdravko V. Mužina issued a call for a convention to organize a fraternal benefit society for Americans of Croatian descent. Three hundred people met in response to the call on January 14, 1894 in Allegheny City, Pennsylvania. Only a handful of people signed up and paid dues to the new group. Mužina arranged for another meeting on September 2, 1894 which merged six Croatian societies into a new group, the Croatian Federation. This group changed its name to the National Croatian Society in 1897. In 1926 the National Croatian Society merged with the Croatian League of Illinois of Chicago, St. Joseph Society of Kansas City, Kansas and the New Croatian Society of Whiting, Indiana to form the Croatian Fraternal Union. In 1939 the CFU absorbed the Slovanic Croatian Union.

The CFU built a new Home Office building in the Oakland neighborhood of Pittsburgh in 1928–29. The building featured ornate Flemish Gothic terra cotta ornamentation and was nominated as a Pittsburgh historic landmark in 2018. In 1961, the organization moved to a new headquarters in Wilkins Township.

A street in Zagreb, capital of Croatia, is called Street of the Croatian Fraternal Union. The National and University Library in Zagreb, one of Croatia's central cultural institutions, is located in that street. Josip Marohnić, founding father and first president of the CFU, also has a street named in his honor in Zagreb.

Benefits and activities 

The CFU offers a wide variety of insurance plans. However, it has been an important group in preserving Croatian culture in North America, by supporting Croatian roots, and traditional tamburitza groups. The Zajedničar, the CFU's newspaper, has been in circulation since 1904 and provides insurance information, as well as providing details about CFU cultural events from around the continent. The "Z", as it is called, began as a monthly and became a biweekly in 1909.

Membership 

Membership is open to any one interested. Juvenile memberships are also available.

In the late 1960s the CFU had 110,000 members. This declined to 100,000 members in 1979. That year the CFU had 1,000 lodges in twenty six states and several Canadian provinces. The CFU had 90,000 members in 1988.

Current officers

National board

High Trial Board

Junior Cultural Federation

Lodges

United States

Canada

Croatia

References

External links
 Official Website

Croatian-American culture in Pennsylvania
Croatian-American history
Fraternal Union
Organizations established in 1894
Ethnic fraternal orders in the United States
Croatian-Canadian culture
Organizations based in Pittsburgh
1894 establishments in Pennsylvania